Monarch was an automobile marque first sold by Ford Canada in 1946. It was produced through 1957 and revived for 1959 to 1961.

The cars 

The first Monarchs debuted in 1946, as contemporary Mercury models with Canadian market-specific trim, unique grilles, taillights and other trim to marginally differentiate them from their Mercury relatives. Monarch model names included Richelieu, Lucerne and Sceptre; these were variations of the Mercury Eight (later the Monterey), Montclair and Park Lane models, respectively. The Monarch line provided Canadian Ford dealerships a product to sell in the medium-price field, similar to Ford of Canada offering the Meteor line of lower-price vehicles which were actually Ford models with Mercury-like trim and model names. This was typical practice in the Canadian market, where smaller towns might have only a single dealer who was expected to offer a full range of products in various price classes.

The Monarch line of vehicles was dropped for 1958 when the Edsel was introduced, but the poor acceptance of the Edsel led Ford to reintroduce Monarch for 1959. With a drop in medium-priced vehicle sales in the early 1960s, and the introduction of the similarly priced Ford Galaxie, the Monarch brand was dropped again after the 1961 model year, with approximately 95,450 cars built in 15 years.

References

Rear-wheel-drive vehicles
1950s cars
Cars introduced in 1946
Cars of Canada
Defunct companies of Ontario
Luxury motor vehicle manufacturers
Ford Motor Company of Canada
Monarch
Coupés
Sedans
Station wagons
1960s cars
Defunct manufacturing companies of Canada
Ford Motor Company Marques